The pied harrier (Circus melanoleucos) is an Asian species of bird of prey in the family Accipitridae. It is migratory, breeding from the Amur valley in eastern Russia and north-eastern China to North Korea. Wintering individuals can be found in a wide area from Pakistan to Philippines. The population consists of approximately 10,000 individuals and the number is thought to be in moderate decline.

This medium-sized harrier (length 45 cm/18in, wing span 115 cm/46in) nests in steppes and associated wetlands. Wintering individuals are often seen hunting above rice paddies and marshes.

Gallery

References

pied harrier
Birds of prey of Asia
Birds of Manchuria
Birds of Mongolia
pied harrier
Taxa named by Thomas Pennant